The 2007 FA Women's Cup Final was the 37th final of the FA Women's Cup, England's primary cup competition for women's football teams. It was the 14th final to be held under the direct control of the Football Association (FA). The final was contested between Arsenal and Charlton Athletic at the City Ground on 7 May 2007. Arsenal won the game 4–1 to secure their second successive FA Cup triumph and their eight in total. The match was attended by a crowd of 24,529 and was broadcast live on BBC One.

Match

Summary
Already winners of the UEFA Women's Cup, FA Women's Premier League National Division and the FA Women's Premier League Cup, Arsenal, managed by Vic Akers, came into the game as favourites. Meanwhile Charlton Athletic, managed by Keith Boanas, came through a hard fought semi-final against Blackburn Rovers, with Natasha Dowie scoring the only goal, to make it to their second final.

Charlton Athletic were given the dream start after just two minutes of play, as Eniola Aluko's low cross was slotted in at the far post by Katie Holtham. Arsenal were level within five minutes, as Kelly Smith curled home a 25-yard free-kick after being hacked down by Charlton's right-back Maria Bertelli. The Gunners were in front by the quarter hour after winning a free kick near the corner flag: Jayne Ludlow was the quickest to get to Lianne Sanderson's near post cross and she steered her shot underneath goalkeeper Toni-Anne Wayne. Ludlow then claimed her second goal in first-half stoppage-time with a 30-yard strike which flew into the top corner of the net.

Charlton's best chance of the second half came when Aluko broke away and shot through Emma Byrne's legs, but the shot was diverted wide of the post by the goalkeeper's leg. Meanwhile, the Gunners had plenty of chances to further their lead, but the fourth goal came when Smith curled in a shot nine minutes from time, wrapping up a record-equalling eighth FA Cup win.

Details

References

2007
2006–07 in English women's football
FA Women's Cup Final, 2007
FA Women's Cup Final, 2007
FA Women's Cup Final